Chaetexorista is a genus of flies in the family Tachinidae.

Species
C. ateripalpis Shima, 1973
C. eutachinoides (Baranov, 1932)
C. javana Brauer & von Bergenstamm, 1895
C. klapperichi Mesnil, 1960
C. lushaiensis Lahiri, 2007
C. microchaeta Chao, 1965
C. palpis Chao, 1965
C. pavlovskyi (Stackelberg, 1943)
C. setosa Chao, 1965
C. solomonensis Baranov, 1936

References

Tachinidae genera
Exoristinae
Taxa named by Friedrich Moritz Brauer
Taxa named by Julius von Bergenstamm